Sokk is an Estonian surname. Notable people with the surname include:

Rein Sokk (born 1959), Estonian sport coach and track and field athlete
Sten-Timmu Sokk (born 1989), Estonian professional basketball point guard
Tanel Sokk (born 1985), Estonian professional basketball point guard
Tiit Sokk (born  1964), Estonian professional basketball point guard

Estonian-language surnames